In the early 1950s the London County Council obtained use of Woolverstone Hall near Ipswich, Suffolk, and some  of adjoining land for the purpose of establishing a secondary grammar boarding school for London boys.  The premises were previously occupied by the LNS Woolverstone, a branch of the London Nautical School, some students of which were permitted to complete their education in the new environment, which commenced experimentally in 1950. In September 1951, the new school formally opened with mostly new teaching staff under a new headmaster, J. S. H. Smitherman. It became comprehensive in 1977, under the auspices of the Inner London Education Authority. The school closed in 1990 and the site was sold to the Girls' Day School Trust. In 1992 it became the home of Ipswich High School.

Notable former students

 Peter Alexander (actor)
 Graham Barlow  (cricketer)
 Tim Cresswell (geographer and poet)
 Charles De'Ath (actor)
 Cedric Delves (former commander of the SAS)
 Peter Donaldson (Radio 4 newsreader)
 Alan Gould (novelist and poet) 
 George Hargreaves (politician)
 Phill Jupitus (comedian)
 Ian McCulloch (actor and writer)
 Ian McEwan (novelist, Booker Prize winner)
 Tony Mitton (poet and children's writer)
 Mark Moore (musician) 
 Martin Offiah (England and Great Britain rugby league international)
 Ben Onwukwe (actor)
 Justin Packshaw (Entrepreneur, philanthropist and adventurer)
 Neil Pearson (actor)
 Fay Presto  (magician)
 Ade Sapara (actor)
 Jonathan Sayeed (ex-Conservative MP)
 Guy Stevens (music executive)
 Mark Wing-Davey (actor and theatre director)
 Skibadee (musician)
 Ben Volpeliere-Pierrot ( musician)

References

Further reading
 Smitherman, J. S. H. Two historical articles from the School magazine, Janus, 1972.
 Online copies of Janus

External links
 Woolverstone Hall School online old boys resource
 Woolverstone Hall School online photograph and document archive

Defunct schools in Suffolk
Educational institutions established in 1951
Educational institutions disestablished in 1990
1951 establishments in England
1990 disestablishments in England
Woolverstone